This is a list of the first minority male lawyer(s) and judge(s) in Idaho. It includes the year in which they were admitted to practice law (in parentheses). Also included are other distinctions, such as the first minority men in their state to graduate from law school or become a political figure.

Firsts in Idaho's history

Lawyers 
 First African American male to pass bar exam: Joseph R. Mitchem in 1908  
 First African American male (admitted to Idaho State Bar): Reginald Ray Reeves (1952)

State judges 

 First Latino American male: Sergio A. Gutierrez in 1993 
 First Latino American male (Idaho Court of Appeals): Sergio A. Gutierrez in 2002 
 First African American male: Dayo O. Onanubosi (1993) in 2009

Attorney General of Idaho 

 First Native American male: Larry Echo Hawk from 1991-1995

Firsts in local history 

 Dayo O. Onanubosi (1993): First African American male appointed as a magistrate judge for Canyon County, Idaho (2009)
 Reginald Ray Reeves (1952): First African American male to graduate from the University of Idaho College of Law (1952) [Moscow County, Idaho]

See also 
 List of first minority male lawyers and judges in the United States

Other topics of interest 

 List of first women lawyers and judges in the United States
 List of first women lawyers and judges in Idaho

References 

 
Minority, Idaho, first
Minority, Idaho, first
Lists of people from Idaho
Idaho lawyers
law